The Gracie Awards are awards presented by the Alliance for Women in Media Foundation (AWM) in the United States, to celebrate and honor programming created for women, by women, and about women, as well as individuals who have made exemplary contributions in electronic media and affiliates. Presented annually, the Gracie Awards recognize national, local, and student works.

History 
The Gracie Awards ceremony is presented by the Alliance for Women in Media Foundation (AWM), since 1975. The awards are named after radio and television star Gracie Allen.  Allen was a successful comedian, entertainer, entrepreneur and activist. As half of the Burns and Allen act, one of the most prominent comedy teams in American history, with husband  George Burns, Allen has been a role model for women in media and entertainment.

Deadline Hollywood describes the awards as follows:

The Gracie Awards are held on two days, known as the gala and the luncheon. The Gracie Awards Gala is a black tie evening affair and awards individuals in the national and mainstream arena. The Gracie Awards Gala has been regularly held at the Beverly Hilton Hotel in Los Angeles, California. The Gracie Awards Luncheon, a more casual affair, honors local, public, online, and student works and has been held in New York.

The 2019 ceremony took place on May 21, with the "local and student award winners," honored on June 26.

The 2020 ceremony was held virtually on September 10, 2020, and honorees included Katy Perry for the Gracies Impact Award, Gayle King,  Michelle Williams, Niecy Nash, Trisha Yearwood, Ginger Zee, Alex Duda and Izzie Pick Ibarra.

Categories 

The following were the categories as of the 2014 ceremony: 
 Outstanding Anchor – News or News Magazine
 Outstanding Comedy
 Outstanding Director – Entertainment
 Outstanding Director – News
 Outstanding Documentary
 Outstanding Drama
 Outstanding Ensemble Cast – Comedy
 Outstanding Ensemble Cast – Drama
 Outstanding Family Programming
 Outstanding Female Actor in a Breakthrough Role
 Outstanding Female Actor in a Featured or Guest Role
 Outstanding Female Actor in a Leading Role in a Comedy
 Outstanding Female Actor in a Leading Role in a Drama
 Outstanding Female Actor in a Supporting Role in a Comedy or Musical
 Outstanding Female Actor in a Supporting Role in a Drama
 Outstanding Hard News Feature
 Outstanding Host – Entertainment/Information
 Outstanding Host – Lifestyle/Health Program
 Outstanding Host – News/Non-Fiction
 Outstanding Interview Program or Feature
 Outstanding Investigative Program or Feature
 Outstanding Lifestyle/Health Program
 Outstanding Morning/Afternoon Drive Personality
 Outstanding On-Air Talent: Sports Program
 Outstanding Online Host or Correspondent
 Outstanding Online Producer
 Outstanding Original Online Programming – Audio
 Outstanding Original Online Programming – News/Documentary
 Outstanding Original Online Programming – Series
 Outstanding Original Online Programming – Standalone Video
 Outstanding Producer – Documentary/Reality
 Outstanding Producer – Entertainment
 Outstanding Producer – News
 Outstanding Reality Show
 Outstanding Reporter/Correspondent
 Outstanding Series
 Outstanding Soft News Feature
 Outstanding Special or Variety
 Outstanding Sports Program
 Outstanding Talk Show – Entertainment/Information
 Outstanding Talk Show – News

Participants 
Gala Hosts from 2005–2014
Paula Zahn, Megan Mullally, Lesley Visser, Giuliana Rancic, Niecy Nash, Maria Menounos, Patricia Heaton, Angela Kinsey, Lana Parrilla, Aisha Tyler

Gala Performers from 2005–2014
Gloria Gaynor, Miri Ben-Ari, Dance Times Square, Onyx, Elisabeth Withers-Mendez, Dwana Smallwood, Girl Scouts Chorus of Nassau County, Taylor Swift, Dianne Reeves, Melissa Pabon Dancers, Darlin Garcia, The Stunners, Macy Gray, Melissa Etheridge, Deniece Williams, Kimberley Locke

Luncheon Hosts from 2005–2014
Rene Syler, Roz Abrams, Nancy Giles, Kim Guthrie, Deborah Norville, Moll Anderson

Caring Is Sexy Award
Angie Harmon, Giuliana Rancic

Dove Real Beauty Award
Shaun Robinson, Jessica Simpson, Amy Poehler, Lisa Ling, Joy Behar, Linda Ellerbee, Gayle King

See also
 List of media awards honoring women
 McCall's Golden Mike Award
 Broadway theatre
 George Burns

References

External links 
 The Gracies | Alliance for Women in Media

Mass media awards honoring women
American television awards
American radio awards
Award shows by Associated Television International
Awards established in 1975
1975 establishments in the United States
Gracie Allen